Julius Dirksen (born 2 February 2003) is a Dutch football player. He plays as a left-back for Eredivisie club Emmen.

Club career
Dirksen spent four seasons in the youth system of Ajax but only appeared on the bench for Jong Ajax and was never called up to the senior squad.

On 31 January 2022, Dirksen signed a contract with Emmen until June 2023, with an option to extend for an additional year. He did not make any appearances for their senior squad for the remainder of the 2021–22 season.

He made his Eredivisie debut for Emmen on 4 September 2022 in a game against AZ Alkmaar, as a half-time substitute. He made his first start six days later against Excelsior.

References

External links
 

2003 births
Sportspeople from Amersfoort
Footballers from Utrecht (province)
Living people
Dutch footballers
Netherlands youth international footballers
Association football defenders
Jong Ajax players
FC Emmen players
Eredivisie players